St. James A. M. E. Church is a congregation of the African Methodist Episcopal Church in Sanford, Florida, United States. The oldest church in Sanford founded by African Americans, it was established in 1867, when the church purchased land on the corner of East Ninth Street and South Cypress Avenue.

The original church building was replaced in 1913 with a red brick Gothic Revival building designed by local architect Prince W. Spears.

In 1989, it was listed in A Guide to Florida's Historic Architecture prepared by the Florida Association of the American Institute of Architects and published by the University of Florida Press. On April 24, 1992, it was added to the U.S. National Register of Historic Places.

References

External links

 Seminole County listings at National Register of Historic Places
 Florida's Office of Cultural and Historical Programs
 Seminole County listings
 St. James AME Church
 Sanford Historical Trail at Historic Hiking Trails

Gallery

National Register of Historic Places in Seminole County, Florida
Churches on the National Register of Historic Places in Florida
African Methodist Episcopal churches in Florida
Churches in Seminole County, Florida
1867 establishments in Florida
Religious organizations established in 1867
Churches completed in 1913